Earl of Pomfret (alias Pontefract) was a title in the Peerage of Great Britain created in 1721 for Thomas Fermor, 2nd Baron Leominster. It became extinct upon the death of the fifth earl in 1867.

Ancestral titles and achievements
The Fermor family descended from Richard Fermor (d. 1552) who acquired great wealth as a wool merchant and merchant. However, he fell out with Henry VIII after remaining an adherent of Catholicism and had his estates confiscated. Some of the estates, including Easton Neston, South Northamptonshire were restored after the accession of Edward VI.

His grandson Sir George Fermor entertained James I and Anne of Denmark at Easton Neston in 1603 and in 1615 was confirmed by the crown following his marriage as lord of the manor of Westoning, Bedfordshire.

Sir George's grandson William Fermor was created a Baronet, of Easton Neston in the County of Northampton, in the Baronetage of England in 1641, aged nineteen and succeeded by his son. He was raised to the Peerage of England as Baron Leominster, in the County of Hereford, in 1692. His eldest son was elevated to become Earl of Pomfret in 1721. The latter was succeeded by his son who became a Gentleman of the Bedchamber to George III and sold the manor of Westoning in 1767 to John Everitt. Two sons, the third and fourth Earls succeeded. The titles became extinct on the death of the fourth Earl's son in 1867.

The seat of the Fermor family was Easton Neston in Northamptonshire. The house came into the Hesketh family (who were later created Barons Hesketh) through the marriage in 1846 of Sir Thomas George Hesketh, 5th Baronet, of Rufford, to Lady Anna Maria Arabella Fermor, sister and heiress of the 5th Earl of Pomfret. The main blocks and much of the gothick village of Hulcote were sold by the 3rd Baron Hesketh in 2005 to Leon Max.

Fermor Baronets, of Easton Neston (1641)

Sir William Fermor, 1st Baronet (1619–1661)
Sir William Fermor, 2nd Baronet (see below) (created Baron Leominster in 1692)

Barons Leominster (1692)
William Fermor, 1st Baron Leominster (1648–1711)
Thomas Fermor, 2nd Baron Leominster (see below) (created Earl of Pomfret in 1721)

Earls of Pomfret (1721)
Thomas Fermor, 1st Earl of Pomfret (1698–1753)
George Fermor, 2nd Earl of Pomfret (1722–1785)
George Fermor, 3rd Earl of Pomfret (1768–1830)
Thomas William Fermor, 4th Earl of Pomfret (1770–1833)
George Richard William Fermor, 5th Earl of Pomfret (1824–1867)

See also
Baron Hesketh

Notes and references
Notes

References

Extinct earldoms in the Peerage of Great Britain
Noble titles created in 1721